This is a list of notable people from Heerlen, The Netherlands.

Born in Heerlen 

The following were born or adopted in Heerlen. Some became famous after they moved away.

A 
 Wiel Arets (1955), architect and urban planner

B 
 Thomas Bernhard (1931–1989), novelist and playwright
 Jessica Blaszka (1992), wrestler
 Melanie Bonajo (1978), artist and filmmaker
 Roel Brouwers (1981), football player

C 
 Jo Coenen (1949), architect and urban planner

D 
 Johan Michiel Dautzenberg (1808–1869), writer and poet
 Isabelle Diks (1965), politician

E 
 Silvio Erkens (1990), politician

G 
 Harrie Geelen (1939), illustrator and writer
 Agnes Giebel (1921-2017), classical soprano
 Dion Graus (1967), politician

H 
 Hubert-Jan Henket (1940), architect
 Loek Hermans (1951), politician
 Tamara Hoekwater (1972), singer
 Danny Hoesen (1991), football player
 Jan Hugens (1939-2011), road cyclist
 Guus Hupperts (1992), football player

K 
 Shirley Kocacinar (1986), football player

L 
 Jef Lataster (1922-2014), long distance runner
 Romée Leuchter (2001), football player

M 
 Issam El Maach (2000), football player
 Jan Mans (1940-2021), politician and mayor
 Eugène Martineau (1980), decathlete 
 Jan Mertens (1916–2000), politician

P 
 Jeanine Hennis-Plasschaert (1973), politician

R 
 Peter Raedts (1948-2021), medievalist
 Fernando Ricksen (1976-2019), football player
 Jo Ritzen (1945), economist and politician
 Rob Ruijgh (1986), road cyclist

S 
 Peter Joseph Savelberg (1827–1907), priest and missionary
 Pierre Schunck (1906-1993), businessman and resistance leader
 Ger Senden (1971), football player
 Nicoline van der Sijs (1955), linguist and etymologist 
 Rutger Stuffken (1947), Olympic rower
 Jules Szymkowiak (1995), racing driver

T 
 Gijs Tuinman (1979), knighted military officer
 Nic. Tummers (1928-2020), politician

V 
 Klaas de Vries (1943), politician

W 
 Carlijn Welten (1987), field hockey player
 Oswald Wenckebach (1895–1962), sculptor and painter

Born somewhere else 

These people were not born or adopted in Heerlen but are or were well known for living there.

G 
 Rob Geus (1971), cook and TV presenter (Rotterdam)

P 
 Frits Peutz (1896–1974), architect (Uithuizen)

S 
 Peter Schunck (1873–1960), businessman (Hergenrath, Prussia)
 Fatih Sonkaya (1981), football player (Oltu, Turkey)

T 
 Frans Timmermans (1961), politician (Maastricht)

W 
 Jan de Wit (1945), politician (Zevenbergen)

Mayors of Heerlen

 
Heerlen